Crybaby Bridge is a nickname given to some bridges in the United States. The name often reflects an urban legend that the sound of a baby can be, or has been, heard from the bridge. Many are also accompanied by an urban legend relating to a baby or young child/children where the mother threw her baby off the bridge and felt so bad that she killed herself. She now looks for her baby while crying in the river sadly.

Kentucky
A bridge on Sleepy Hollow Road near the border between Jefferson and Oldham counties in Kentucky was known as Crybaby Bridge.  Reportedly, mothers would drop their unwanted, sick, or deformed babies off the bridge to drown in the water, and their crying can still be heard there.  The original bridge has been replaced by a newer one made of steel and concrete.  The bridge is one of several rumors about locations along Sleepy Hollow Road.

Ohio

Rogue's Hollow
One of many purported crybaby bridges is located near Doylestown, Ohio, in an area known as Rogue's Hollow. This bridge is located on Galehouse Road, between Rogue Hollow Road and Hametown Road. The bridge spans Silver Creek. Deep in Rogue's Hollow, this road previously led from the bottom of the hollow (Hametown Rd.) to the top (Rogue Hollow Rd.). The bridge is only approachable from Hametown Rd. from May to October, as the steeper portion of the road is seasonally closed to prevent accidents. The bridge is property of the Rogue's Hollow historical society, which also owns the adjacent Chidester Mill.

Map:

The Screaming Bridge of Maud Hughes Road
Maud Hughes Road is located in Liberty Township, Butler County, Ohio. It is reputed to have been the site of many terrible accidents and suicides. Railroad tracks lie 25 feet below the bridge, and at least 36 people are said to have been reported dead on or around the Maud Hughes Road Bridge. Ghostly figures, mists, and lights have been reported, as well as black hooded figures and a phantom train. The legend says that a car carrying a man and a woman stalled on top of the bridge. The man got out to get help while the girl stayed. When the man returned, the girl was hanging on the bridge above the tracks. The man then supposedly perished with unexplained causes. To this day, many people have reported hearing the ghosts' conversations, then a woman's scream followed by a man's scream. A second story is that a woman was being chased down the road and when she got to the bridge she did not know the area and thought that there was a river underneath, so she jumped over the bridge and when she saw the train tracks screamed all the way down to her death. They say that to this day, on certain nights, you can still hear her screaming. Another popular and typical Crybaby Bridge story says that a woman once threw her baby off the bridge and hung herself afterward.
Map:

Egypt Road, Salem

Although the bridge is off of Egypt Road near Salem, Ohio, it is actually on what used to be West Pine Lake Rd., which now dead-ends to the east of the bridge. Legends attribute the crying baby to one that fell in and accidentally drowned. There is also a rumor that there is a cult of some sort in the woods surrounding the bridge. In 2010, there was a murder of an elderly woman that was found, strangled to death, and burned just off the bridge. The closed road remains as an access way to high-voltage utility lines. The "baby cries" have been said to be heard at night or during the day.

Map:

Wisner Road
This crybaby bridge is in the area of the melon heads. The bridge is on Wisner Road in Chardon Township, Geauga County, Ohio, just north of Kirtland Chardon Rd. A large section of the road is permanently closed; the bridge lies just before the south end of the closed section.

Maryland 

In Weird Maryland: Your Travel Guide to Maryland's Local Legends and Best Kept Secrets, authors Matt Lake, Mark Moran, and Mark Sceurman include three first-person narratives of crybaby bridge experiences in Maryland. The locations mentioned are the Governor's Bridge Road bridge, one on Lottsford Vista Road, and a third unspecified but possibly described the Lottsford Vista Road bridge as well. The latter narratives make mention of purported Satanic churches near the bridge and the appearance of the Goatman.

Texas

De Kalb
"Crybaby Bridge", or "Spook Bridge", located about 25 miles west of Texarkana, runs across county road 4130, located 4 miles south of De Kalb, Texas. Legend says that a mother driving a car plunged into the creek, and the baby drowned in the near-freezing waters.

Lufkin
Jack Creek, a stream west of Lufkin, Texas, has for years been known as Cry Baby Creek, supposedly because a woman and a baby died when their auto veered off a wooden bridge and fell into the steep creek. Annette Sawyer of Lufkin said visitors who come to the site at night claim they have heard sounds resembling a baby crying. One visitor supposedly found the imprint of a baby’s hand on her auto window after returning from the bridge.

Port Neches
"Sarah Jane Bridge" on East Port Neches Avenue in Port Neches, Texas, is said to be the bridge from which a baby of the same name was thrown into the alligator-infested water by a man who had murdered the child's mother. It is said Sarah Jane can be heard crying from the water when one stands on the bridge on hot summer nights. The child's mother, a headless ghost wandering the woods nearby, can also be heard whispering "Sarah Jane" as she searches the forest with a lantern. The legendary Sarah Jane is Sarah Jane Block, who lost no children and lived to the age of 99.

Controversy 
In 1999, Maryland folklorist Jesse Glass presented a case against several crybaby bridges being genuine folklore, contending that they were instead fakelore that was knowingly being propagated through the internet.<ref>{{cite web|url=http://onlinebooks.library.upenn.edu/webbin/book/lookupid?key=olbp37916 |title=The University of Pennsylvania Online Books Page for The Witness; Slavery in Nineteenth Century Carroll County, Maryland |publisher=Onlinebooks.library.upenn.edu |date=2013-10-25 |access-date=2019-08-27}}</ref>

According to Glass, nearly identical stories of crybaby bridges in Maryland and Ohio began to appear online in 1999, but they could not be confirmed through local oral history or the media.

Among Glass' examples was the story of a bridge located in Westminster, Maryland, which concerned the murder of escaped slaves and African American children. It's located specifically on Rockland Road, just off of Uniontown Road outside of Westminster's city limits past Rt. 31. In the 1800s, the story held, unwanted black babies were drowned by being thrown off this bridge. Regional newspapers, such as the American Sentinel and the Democratic Advocate, which usually covered racially motivated murders of the period, make no mention of the events described online.

However, in their book Weird U.S.: Your Travel Guide to America's Local Legends and Best Kept Secrets'', authors Mark Moran and Mark Sceurman relate the story of a purported crybaby bridge on Lottsford Vista Road between Bowie and Upper Marlboro, asserting that this bridge has "made believers out of many skeptics." The text included from their informant makes no mention of escaped slaves but does repeat a familiar component of such legends: an out-of-wedlock birth.

See also
 Overtoun Bridge

References

Sources
 

American folklore
Reportedly haunted locations in the United States
Maryland folklore
Bridges in the United States